Back to the Light is the debut solo studio album by English musician Brian May, the guitarist of Queen. It was released on 28 September 1992 by Parlophone Records in the UK, and on 2 February 1993 by Hollywood Records in the US and Canada. May's second solo release following his 1983 EP Star Fleet Project, Back to the Light was co-produced with Justin Shirley-Smith and recorded between March 1988 and November 1992 at Allerton Hill—May's home studio—and mixed at Metropolis Studios.

The album contains top 10 singles "Too Much Love Will Kill You" and "Driven by You", and peaked at number six on the UK Albums Chart and at number 159 on the US Billboard 200.

"Headlong" and "I Can't Live with You", released on Innuendo, were originally intended for Back to the Light; but when May heard Freddie Mercury singing the songs, he decided they would be recorded by Queen.

Songs 
"The Dark" is the album's "short keyboard and guitar intro," "an atmospheric opener...recorded during sessions for Flash Gordon in 1980 at Anvil Studios with orchestrations by Howard Blake." The lyrics are reminiscent of a lullaby.

"Back to the Light" is "an outpouring of emotion," and was first performed live on The Tonight Show, 5 April 1993. The Time Traveller music video, released as part of the re-released album in 2021, features May travelling back in time to his younger self.

"Love Token", "a well-constructed track", is dominated by Cozy Powell's "thunderous drums[, which] give the song its catchy rhythm....The song was performed live on the Back to the Light Tour, usually after 'Back to the Light' (on the 1992 leg) or 'Tie Your Mother Down' (during the first part of 1993), before becoming an abridged intro to 'Headlong', as evident on the...album Live At The Brixton Academy." The original "explicit" version was never officially released, and was only found on a free CD packaged with Rock Compact Disc Magazine, Vol. 4, 1991. The lyrics speak of a family splitting apart.

"Resurrection" is a duet between Powell's drum and May's guitar work and vocals, a tribute to a friendship which would be cut short by Powell's premature death in 1998. It was initially recorded as 'Ride to Win' on Cozy Powell's 1992 solo album, The Drums Are Back. "The lyrics feature few references to organized religion, being of a more personal nature, as elsewhere on Back to the Light, [May] channels his confusion of life without [Mercury] into song." The music video features May and Powell playing their instruments, and lots of early CGI graphics.

"Too Much Love Will Kill You" was recorded by Queen for The Miracle and rejected over songwriting royalties, eventually being released in 1995 on Made in Heaven. May performed the song unaccompanied except for piano during The Freddie Mercury Tribute Concert. A guitar version "was released as part of the CD single in August 1992."

"Driven by You", Brian's famed Ford advert theme, was released on 25 November 1991. Three different versions were recorded and used—"all sounding similar and lasting ninety seconds each", and three different DJ cuts were made.

"Nothin' But Blue" was "initially recorded as 'Somewhere In Time' on Cozy Powell's 1992 solo album, The Drums Are Back,...with John [Deacon] on bass". May used the instrumental from that session and added original lyrics to create the version heard on his solo album.

"I'm Scared" is a very personal hard-rocker, one of May's ways of dealing with his depression brought on by his failed first marriage and the death of his father. The version that appears on Back to the Light includes what is called "the 'Chaos Karaoke', a litany of fears" which include "fear of losing control, pain, being unknown, being ugly, dying, [being] deformed, [being] dull, the dark, being found out[,] and...being scared of Stephen Berkoff".

"Last Horizon" was recorded at Allerton Studios in 1988, and is one of May's favorite songs.

"Let Your Heart Rule Your Head", "an unconscious update of...'39....an uplifting, upbeat moment on an album of otherwise bleak and melancholy songs".

"Just One Life" could be misinterpreted as a tribute to Mercury, "but was actually written for actor Philip Sayer". May was inspired to write the song after attending a memorial concert for Sayer, whom May had never met.

"Rollin' Over" is May's cover of The Small Faces' song. "In [May's] hands...the song becomes a scorching tour de force of guitar riffs and exploding drums, turning [it] into what might as well be an outtake from one of Queen's earlier albums (indeed, Smile played it in their touring days)".

Release
The US edition of the album included a bonus track remix of "Driven by You" (with a new drum track by Cozy Powell and new bass by Neil Murray), issued elsewhere as a B-side to "Too Much Love Will Kill You". The Japanese edition included instrumental "Guitar Versions" of "Just One Life" and "Too Much Love Will Kill You".

In June 2021, May announced that the album would be reissued as part of the Brian May Gold Series, packaged with a second disc of bonus tracks titled Out of the Light. The reissue was released on August 6, 2021.

Track listing

Personnel

Musicians 

 Brian May - lead vocals, rhythm and lead guitar, bass, piano, keyboards, programming, backing vocals.
 Cozy Powell – drums 
 Geoff Dugmore – drums 
 Gary Tibbs – bass 
 Neil Murray – bass 
 John Deacon – bass 
 Mike Moran – piano , keyboards 
 Don Airey – keyboards (extra) 
 Gill O'Donovan – backing vocals 
 Maggie Ryder – backing vocals 
 Miriam Stockley – backing vocals 
 Suzie O' List – backing vocals 
 Chris Thompson – backing vocals

Technical 

 Justin Shirley-Smith – co-producer, engineer
 Heidi Cannavo, Noel Haris – engineer (assistant)
 Kevin Metcalfe – mastering
 Brian Zellis – technical assistance, programming
 David Richards – programming
 Bob Ludwig – 2021 remastering

Singles 
 "Driven by You" / "Just One Life" (November 1991) – No. 6
 "Too Much Love Will Kill You" / "I'm Scared" (August 1992) – No. 5
 "Back to the Light" / "Nothin' But Blue" (November 1992) – No. 19
 "Resurrection" / "Love Token" / "Too Much Love Will Kill You" (Live) (June 1993) – No. 23
 "Last Horizon" / "Let Your Heart Rule Your Head" (Live) (December 1993) – No. 51

Charts

Weekly charts

Year-end charts

Certifications

References 

1992 debut albums
Brian May albums
Parlophone albums
Hollywood Records albums